Sequoia National Park is an American national park in the southern Sierra Nevada east of Visalia, California. The park was established on September 25, 1890, and today protects  of forested mountainous terrain. The park is south of, and contiguous with, Kings Canyon National Park; both parks are administered by the National Park Service together as the Sequoia and Kings Canyon National Parks. UNESCO designated the areas as Sequoia-Kings Canyon Biosphere Reserve in 1976.

The park is notable for its giant sequoia trees, including the General Sherman tree, the largest tree on Earth by volume. The General Sherman tree grows in the Giant Forest, which contains five of the ten largest trees in the world. The Giant Forest is connected by the Generals Highway to Kings Canyon National Park's General Grant Grove, home of the General Grant tree among other giant sequoias. The parks preserve a landscape that was first cultivated by the Monachee tribe, the southern Sierra Nevada before Euro-American settlement.

The national park was partially closed in September 2020 due to the Sequoia Complex wildfire, and again from mid-September through mid-December 2021 due to the KNP Complex Fire.

Front country
Many park visitors enter Sequoia National Park through its southern entrance near the town of Three Rivers at Ash Mountain at  elevation. The lower elevations around Ash Mountain contain the only National Park Service-protected California Foothills ecosystem, consisting of blue oak woodlands, foothills chaparral, grasslands, yucca plants, and steep, mild river valleys. Seasonal weather results in a changing landscape throughout the foothills with hot summer yielding an arid landscape while spring and winter rains result in blossoming wildflowers and lush greens. The region is also home to abundant wildlife: bobcats, foxes, ground squirrels, rattlesnakes, and mule deer are commonly seen in this area, and more rarely, reclusive mountain lions and the Pacific fisher are seen as well. The last California grizzly was killed in this park in 1922 (at Horse Corral Meadow). The California Black Oak is a key transition species between the chaparral and higher elevation conifer forest.

Found here are Ponderosa, Jeffrey, sugar, and lodgepole pine trees, as well as abundant white and red fir. Found here too are the giant sequoia trees, the most massive living single-stem trees on earth. Between the trees, spring and summer snowmelts sometimes fan out to form lush, though delicate, meadows. In this region, visitors often see mule deer, Douglas squirrels, and American black bears, which sometimes break into unattended cars to eat food left by careless visitors. There are plans to reintroduce the bighorn sheep to this park.

Back country

The vast majority of the park is roadless wilderness; no road crosses the Sierra Nevada within the park's boundaries. 84 percent of Sequoia and Kings Canyon National Parks is designated wilderness and is accessible only by foot or by horseback. The majority was designated Sequoia-Kings Canyon Wilderness in 1984 and the southwest portion was protected as John Krebs Wilderness in 2009.

Sequoia's backcountry offers a vast expanse of high-alpine wonders. Covering the highest-elevation region of the High Sierra, the backcountry includes Mount Whitney on the eastern border of the park, accessible from the Giant Forest via the High Sierra Trail.

On the floor of this canyon, at least two days hike from the nearest road, is the Kern Canyon hot spring, a popular resting point for weary backpackers. At Mount Whitney, the High Sierra Trail meets with the John Muir Trail and the Pacific Crest Trail, which continue northward along the Sierra crest and into the backcountry of Kings Canyon National Park.

Human history
The area which now is Sequoia National Park shows evidence of Native American settlement as early as 1000 A.D. The area was first home to "Monachee" (Western Mono) Native Americans, who resided mainly in the Kaweah River drainage in the Foothills region of what is now the park, though evidence of seasonal habitation exists as high as the Giant Forest. Members of this tribe were permanent residents of the park, with a population estimate of around 2,000. In the summertime the Tubatulabal Native Americans used the eastern part of the area (the Kern River drainage) as their summer hunting grounds. During this time, the Western Mono tribe would travel over the high mountain passes to trade with tribes to the East. To this day, pictographs can be found at several sites within the park, notably at Hospital Rock and Potwisha, as well as bedrock mortars used to process acorns, a staple food for the Monachee people.  

The first European settler to homestead in the area was Hale Tharp, who famously built a home out of a hollowed-out fallen giant sequoia log in the Giant Forest next to Log Meadow. Tharp arrived in 1858 to the region and encountered several groups of Native Americans, the largest being around 600 with several other smaller groups found at higher elevations.  After becoming friendly with the Western Mono tribe, Tharp was shown the Giant Forest Sequoia Grove. After his settlement, more settlers came around 1860. Shortly thereafter - between 1860 and 1863, epidemics of smallpox, measles, and scarlet fever killed the majority of the Native Americans living in the area. After this, the rest of the Native Americans left with the largest campsite (Hospital Rock) abandoned by 1865. During their time in the area, the Monachee used periodic fire burning to aid in hunting and agriculture. This technique played an important role in the ecology of the region and allowed for a "natural" vegetation cover development. After they left, Tharp and other settlers allowed sheep and cattle to graze the meadow, while at the same time maintaining a respect for the grandeur of the forest and led early battles against logging in the area. From time to time, Tharp received visits from John Muir, who would stay at Tharp's log cabin. Tharp's Log can still be visited today in its original location in the Giant Forest.

However, Tharp's attempts to conserve the giant sequoias were at first met with only limited success. In the 1880s, white settlers seeking to create a utopian society founded the Kaweah Colony, which sought economic success in trading Sequoia timber. However, Giant Sequoia trees, unlike their coast redwood relatives, were later discovered to splinter easily and therefore were ill-suited to timber harvesting, though thousands of trees were felled before logging operations finally ceased. The National Park Service incorporated the Giant Forest into Sequoia National Park in 1890, the year of its founding, promptly ceasing all logging operations in the Giant Forest.

Another consequence of the Giant Forest becoming Sequoia National Park was the shift in park employment. Prior to the incorporation by the National Park Service, the park was managed by US army troops of the 24th Regiment of Infantry and the 9th Regiment of Cavalry, better known as the Buffalo Soldiers. These segregated troops, founded in 1866, were African-American men from the South, an invaluable demographic to the military with the lowest rates of desertion. The Buffalo Soldiers completed park infrastructure projects as well as park management duties, helping to shape the role of the modern-day park ranger. The Buffalo Soldiers rose to this position due to a lack of funding for the park which led to an inability to hire civilians. The third African American West Point graduate, Captain Charles Young led the cavalries of Buffalo Soldiers in the Sequoia and General Grant Parks. Young landed this post as a result of the segregation rampant throughout the Army: as a black man, he was not permitted to head any combat units. He did, however, demonstrate his leadership capability through his initiatives in the National Park delegating park infrastructure projects, hosting tourists and politicians, and setting a standard of a strong work ethic into his men. Young was also a prominent figure regarding the early conservation of Sequoia National Park. He greenlighted the dedication of trees in honor of prominent figures as a means of promoting their preservation. One such example is the Redwood dedicated to the escaped slave and activist, Booker T Washington. Young also argued to the Secretary of the Interior that the lack of enforcement of forest protection laws allowed the detrimental practices of logging and the popular tourist hobby of carving names into the redwoods to continue. To combat this, Young increased patrolling of troops around heavily trafficked areas and initiated a proposal to buy out private landowners surrounding Sequoia to further buffer the protected area.

The land buyouts Young initiated were just the beginning of increasing the area of Sequoia National Park. The park has expanded several times over the decades to its present size; one of the most significant expansions took place in 1926 and was advocated for by Susan Thew Parks. One of the most recent expansions occurred in 1978, when grassroots efforts, spearheaded by the Sierra Club, fought off attempts by the Walt Disney Corporation to purchase a high-alpine former mining site south of the park for use as a ski resort. This site known as Mineral King was annexed to the park. Its name dates back to early 1873 when the miners in the area formed the Mineral King Mining District.  Mineral King is the highest-elevation developed site within the park and a popular destination for backpackers.

Climate

According to the Köppen climate classification system, Sequoia National Park encompasses five climate types listed here from highest to lowest elevation; Tundra (ET), Mediterranean-influenced Subarctic climate (Dsc), Mediterranean-influenced warm-summer Humid continental climate (Dsb), Warm-summer Mediterranean climate (Csb), and  Hot-summer Mediterranean climate (Csa). Precipitation also decreases with elevation.

Geology
Sequoia National Park contains a significant portion of the Sierra Nevada. The Great Western Divide parallels the Sierran crest and is visible at various places in the park, for example, Mineral King, Moro Rock, and the Giant Forest.

Most of the mountains and canyons in the Sierra Nevada are composed of granitic rocks. These rocks, such as granite, diorite and monzonite, formed when molten rock cooled far beneath the surface of the earth. The molten rock was the result of a geologic process known as subduction. Powerful forces in the earth forced the landmass under the waters of the Pacific Ocean beneath and below an advancing North American Continent. Super-hot water driven from the subducting ocean floor migrated upward and melted rock as it proceeded. This process took place during the Cretaceous Period, 100 million years ago. Granitic rocks have a speckled salt-and-pepper appearance because they contain various minerals including quartz, feldspars and micas. Valhalla, or the Angel Wings, are prominent granitic cliffs that rise above the headwaters of the Middle Fork of the Kaweah River.

The Sierra Nevada is a young mountain range, probably not more than 10 million years old. Forces in the earth, probably associated with the development of the Great Basin, forced the mountains to rise. During the last 10 million years, at least four ice ages have coated the mountains in a thick mantle of ice. Glaciers form and develop during long periods of cool and wet weather. Glaciers move very slowly through the mountains, carving deep valleys and craggy peaks. The extensive history of glaciation within the range and the erosion resistant nature of the granitic rocks that make up most of the Sierra Nevada have together created a landscape of hanging valleys, waterfalls, craggy peaks, alpine lakes (such as Tulainyo Lake) and glacial canyons.

Park caves, like most caves in the Sierra Nevada of California, are mostly solutional caves dissolved from marble. Marble rock is essentially limestone that was metamorphosed by the heat and pressure of the formation and uplift of the Sierra Nevada Batholith. The batholith's rapid uplift over the past 10 million years led to a rapid erosion of the metamorphic rocks in the higher elevations, exposing the granite beneath; therefore, most Sierra Nevada caves are found in the middle and lower elevations (below ), though some caves are found in the park at elevations as high as  such as the White Chief cave and Cirque Cave in Mineral King. These caves are carved out of the rock by the abundant seasonal streams in the park. Most of the larger park caves have, or have had, sinking streams running through them.

Crystal Cave was discovered on April 28, 1918, by Alex Medley and Cassius Webster. The cave is a constant , and is only accessible by guided tour.

Caves are discovered every year in the park with the most recently discovered major cave being Ursa Minor in August 2006.

Flora and fauna

According to the A. W. Kuchler U.S. Potential natural vegetation Types, Sequoia National Park encompasses five classifications listed here from highest to lowest elevation; Alpine tundra & barren vegetation type with an Alpine tundra vegetation form...Pinus contorta/ Subalpine zone vegetation type with a California Conifer Forest vegetation form...Abies magnifica vegetation type with a California Conifer Forest vegetation form...Mixed conifer vegetation type with a California Conifer Forest vegetation form...and Chaparral vegetation type with a California chaparral and woodlands vegetation form.

Animals that inhabit this park are coyote, badger, black bear, bighorn sheep, deer, fox, cougar, eleven species of woodpecker, various species of turtle, three species of owl, opossum, various species of snake, wolverine, beaver, various species of frog, and muskrat.

Park attractions

In addition to hiking, camping, fishing, and backpacking, the following attractions are highlights with many park visitors:

Sherman Tree Trail An 0.8-mile roundtrip paved trail that descends from the parking lot to the base of the General Sherman tree and meanders through a grove of giant sequoia trees.
Tunnel Log is a fallen giant sequoia tree in Sequoia National Park.
Tokopah Falls The trail to Tokopah Falls starts just beyond the Marble Fork Bridge in Lodgepole Campground. It is an easy 1.7 mile (one way) walk along the Marble Fork of the Kaweah River to the impressive granite cliffs and waterfall of Tokopah Canyon.
Crescent Meadow is a small, sequoia-rimmed meadow in the Giant Forest region of Sequoia National Park. This sierran montane meadow marks the western terminus of the High Sierra Trail, which stretches from the meadow across the Great Western Divide to Mount Whitney. Pioneer Hale Tharp homesteaded in this and nearby Log Meadow. Conservationist John Muir visited this meadow many times and called it the "Gem of the Sierra". The meadow lies at the end of a three-mile paved road which leaves the Generals Highway near the Giant Forest Museum.
Moro Rock is a granite dome located in the center of the park, at the head of Moro Creek, between Giant Forest and Crescent Meadow. A 351-step stairway, built in the 1930s by the Civilian Conservation Corps, is cut into and poured onto the rock, so that visitors can hike to the top. The stairway is listed on the National Register of Historic Places. The view from the rock encompasses much of the Park, including the Great Western Divide.
 Campgrounds in the park include three in the foothills area: Potwisha (42 sites), Buckeye Flat (28 sites), and South Fork (10 sites). Four campgrounds are at higher, conifer-dominated elevations, ranging from : Atwell Mill (21 sites), Cold Springs (40 sites), Lodgepole (214 sites), and Dorst Creek (204 sites).
 Giant Forest Museum offers information about giant sequoias and human history in the forest. The historic museum was built in 1928 by architect Gilbert Stanley Underwood.

See also

 Fauna of the Sierra Nevada
 African-American Heritage Sites
 Bibliography of the Sierra Nevada
 Buffalo Soldier
 Ecology of the Sierra Nevada
 List of giant sequoia groves
 List of largest giant sequoias
 List of national parks of the United States
 List of plants of the Sierra Nevada
 National parks in California
 National Register of Historic Places listings in Sequoia-Kings Canyon National Parks
 Protected areas of the Sierra Nevada
 Seven Horticultural Wonders of the World

References

External links

  of the National Park Service
 Geologic Map of Southwestern Sequoia National Park – United States Geological Survey 
 Virtual reality scenes in Sequoia National Park
 Lary M. Dilsaver and William C. Tweed, Challenge of the Big Trees – natural and human history of the park
 

 
Biosphere reserves of the United States
National parks in California
Parks in Tulare County, California
Protected areas established in 1890
Protected areas of the Sierra Nevada (United States)
1890 establishments in California